Lac-Marguerite is an unorganized territory in Antoine-Labelle Regional County Municipality in the Laurentides region of Quebec, Canada.

Demographics
Population trend:
 Population in 2011: 0
 Population in 2006: 0
 Population in 2001: 0
 Population in 1996: 0
 Population in 1991: 0

See also
 List of unorganized territories in Quebec

References

Unorganized territories in Laurentides